The official motion picture soundtrack for The Da Vinci Code with Thomas Bowes (violinist), King's Consort Choir, Hugh Marsh, Orchestra, Richard Harvey, Hila Plitmann, Martin Tillman was released on May 9, 2006 via Decca label. The film's music was composed by Hans Zimmer, whose work resulted in a nomination for the 2007 Golden Globe Award for Best Original Score.

Style 
For a soundscape that was religious to the core, Zimmer used a massive orchestra and chorus to create a dramatic 'stained glass cathedral' feeling. While the score has more in common with Zimmer's previous work for Hannibal, there is also a solid mixture of the motifs used for The Thin Red Line and Batman Begins. The thirteenth cue, "Chevaliers de Sangreal", is the most bombastic; powerfully underscoring the 'discovery' scene in the film.

Like Media Ventures protégé Harry Gregson-Williams, who composed the soundtrack for The Lion, the Witch and the Wardrobe, Zimmer used Abbey Road Studios to help create his music for The Da Vinci Code. Additional sections were recorded at London's AIR Studios, atop Rosslyn Hill.

Director Ron Howard commented that "Like every other facet of this movie, the score for The Da Vinci Code demanded a range of textures that recognized and reinforced the layers of ideas and emotion, which unfold as the basic story does."  Claiming that Zimmer was "inspired", Howard added that "Hans Zimmer has given us extraordinarily memorable music to appreciate within the framework of a film or completely on its own, where you can let the sounds carry you on your own private journey."

It was rumored that the A-ha song Celice would be in the soundtrack to the film so that song is a double entendre for the torture device, the cilice, and the name of a woman named Celice whose presence seems to torture the men, but this did not occur.

Track listing

Selected credits
Arranged By [Latin Lyrics And Choir Arrangements] –  
Arranged By [Score] – Henry Jackman, Lorne Balfe, Nick Glennie-Smith 
Compiled By [Soundtrack Album] – Mark Wherry 
Composed By [Ambient Music Designer] – Mel Wesson 
Composed By, Arranged By, Producer – Hans Zimmer 
Conductor [Choir] – Nick Glennie-Smith 
Conductor [Music] – Richard Harvey (2) 
Creative Director – Pat Barry (3) 
Design – Frank Famularo 
Edited By [Music] – Simon Changer 
Engineer [Air Studios Assistant Engineer] – Chris Barrett, Jake Jackson 
Executive-Producer [Executive Album Producer] – Brian Grazer, John Calley 
Mastered By [Album] – Louie Teran 
Mixed By [Album] – Alan Meyerson 
Mixed By [Music] – Al Clay
Producer [Music Production Services For Remote Control Productions] – Steven Kofsky 
Recorded By – Geoff Foster 
Supervised By [Spe Music Supervisor] – Bob Badami
℗ © 2006 Universal Music Classics Group, a Division of UMG Recordings. Inc.

Critical response 
The Da Vinci Codes director, Ron Howard, said that the soundtrack was "powerful, fresh and wonderfully effective" and most film music reviewers agreed with him. Soundtrack.Net and Scorereviews rated the score highly. The music was nominated for a 2007 Golden Globe Award for Best Original Score but lost to Alexandre Desplat's work for The Painted Veil.

References

Soundtrack
Hans Zimmer soundtracks
2006 soundtrack albums
2000s film soundtrack albums